Crab Rangoon, sometimes called crab puffs, crab rangoon puffs, or cheese wontons, are filled crisp dumpling appetizers served primarily in American Chinese restaurants.

Preparation
The filling is made with a combination of cream cheese, crab meat or imitation crab meat, scallions or onion, garlic, and other flavorings.  A small amount of the filling is wrapped in each wonton wrapper. The dumpling is then shaped by either folding the wrapper over into a triangle, by creating a four-pointed star, by gathering it up into a flower or purse shape, or by twisting it into the traditional wonton shape.

The appetizers are cooked to crispness by deep-frying in vegetable oil or by baking. They can be served hot or cold. In North America, Crab Rangoon is often served with a sauce for dipping such as soy sauce, plum sauce, duck sauce, sweet and sour sauce, or a hot mustard sauce.

History

Crab Rangoon was on the menu of the "Polynesian-style" restaurant Trader Vic's in San Francisco since at least 1956.  Although the appetizer has the name of a Burmese city, the dish was probably invented in the United States by Joe Young working under Victor Bergeron, founder of Trader Vic's. A "Rangoon crab a la Jack" was mentioned as a dish at a Hawaiian-style party in 1952, but without further detail, and so may or may not be the same thing.

Writing for Atlas Obscura, Dan Nosowitz points out that although cream cheese was a staple of 1940s and 1950s American cuisine, neither Chinese nor Burmese use cream cheese in their cuisines. Since most East Asians are lactose intolerant, including cream cheese in their diet would not be common for those cultures.

Names
They may be referred to as crab puffs, crab pillows, crab cheese wontons, or cheese wontons.

Gallery

See also
 Yau gok
 Curry beef turnover
 Crab puff
 List of crab dishes
 List of deep fried foods
 List of hors d'oeuvre
 List of seafood dishes

References

American Chinese cuisine
Appetizers
Dumplings
Crab dishes
Surimi
Deep fried foods
Tiki culture